General Abdullahi Anod is a Somali military leader. He is a former commander of Somalia's presidential guard unit. On 25 June 2014, Anod was appointed the new Chief of the Somali National Army. He replaced General Dahir Adan Elmi at the position. General Abdullahi Osman Agey was concurrently named as Anod's new Deputy Chief of Army.

References

Somalian military leaders
Living people
Somalian generals
Year of birth missing (living people)
Place of birth missing (living people)